Enallagma recurvatum, the pine barrens bluet, is a species of damselfly in the family Coenagrionidae. It is endemic to the United States.  Its natural habitat is freshwater lakes. It is threatened by habitat loss.

References

 Lam, E. (2004) Damselflies of the Northeast. Forest Hills, NY:Biodiversity Books. p. 66.

Coenagrionidae
Odonata of North America
Endemic fauna of the United States
Insects of the United States
Fauna of the Eastern United States
Insects described in 1913
Taxonomy articles created by Polbot